Emma Hinze (born 17 September 1997) is a German professional racing cyclist. She competed in the 2016 and 2020 UCI Track Cycling World Championships, winning in individual and team sprint as well as in Keirin. Triple world champion, she was seen as a favourite for the Tokyo Olympics , but ultimately failed to win an individual medal, falling to eventual gold medal winner Kelsey Mitchell in the semi-finals and the losing the bout for the bronze medal against Lee Wai-sze. With her partner Lea Friedrich, she was more successful in the team sprint, winning silver. For winning the silver medal at Tokyo she was awarded by the President of the Federal Republic of Germany with the Silver Laurel Leaf, Germany's highest sport-award.

Major results 
2016
3rd Team Sprint, Memorial of Alexander Lesnikov (with Pauline Grabosch)
Grand Prix of Tula
3rd Keirin
3rd Team Sprint (with Pauline Grabosch)
2020
World Championships
1st Keirin
1st Team Sprint
1st Sprint
2021
Tokyo Olympics
2nd Team Sprint (with Lea Friedrich)
4th Sprint

References

External links 
 
 

1997 births
Living people
German female cyclists
Sportspeople from Hildesheim
German track cyclists
UCI Track Cycling World Champions (women)
Olympic cyclists of Germany
Cyclists at the 2020 Summer Olympics
Medalists at the 2020 Summer Olympics
Olympic silver medalists for Germany
Recipients of the Silver Laurel Leaf
Olympic medalists in cycling
Cyclists from Lower Saxony
21st-century German women